Artvin Çoruh University (Turkish: Artvin Çoruh Üniversitesi) is a university located in Artvin, Turkey. It was established in 2007.

Affiliations
The university is a member of the Caucasus University Association.

References

External links
Official Website

Universities and colleges in Turkey
Educational institutions established in 2007
State universities and colleges in Turkey
2007 establishments in Turkey
Artvin